The Polhov Gradec Hills (also , , and ) are a pre-Alpine hilly region of northwestern Slovenia. To the north they border the Škofja Loka Hills, and to the south they border the Ljubljana Basin and the Ljubljana Marsh. The largest watercourse is the Gradaščica River. In 1971, a proposal was put forward to protect the region as a nature park, but it was never formally adopted.

Name
The hills are named after Polhov Gradec, the central settlement in the range. In German, they were known as the Billichgra(t)zer Gebirge or Billichgra(t)zer Bergen (both based on the German name for Polhov Gradec). Slovene geographers have rejected the Slovene name Polhograjski Dolomiti (literally, Polhov Gradec Dolomites) as inappropriate.

Peaks 
 Tošč
 Pasja Ravan
 Grmada
 Mount Polhov Gradec, also Mount St. Lawrence

References

External links 
 

Hills of Slovenia
Landforms of Upper Carniola